The 2021 Champion of Champions (also known as the 2021 Cazoo Champion of Champions for the purposes of sponsorship) was a professional snooker tournament that took place between 15 and 21 November 2021 at the University of Bolton Stadium in Bolton, England. It was the 11th Champion of Champions event, the first of which was held in 1978. The tournament featured 16 participants, primarily winners of significant tournaments since the previous year's event. As an invitational tournament, it carried no world ranking points.

Mark Allen was the defending champion, but he withdrew from the event for personal reasons. His place was awarded to Ding Junhui, the next eligible player on the world ranking list.

Judd Trump faced John Higgins in the final. Although Higgins took a 3–0 lead, Trump won ten of the next 11 frames to secure a 10–4 victory and his first Champion of Champions title with its prize of £100,000. Trump lost just five frames across the four matches he played in the tournament.

Format

Prize fund 
 Winner: £150,000
 Runner-up: £60,000
 Semi-final: £30,000
 Group runner-up: £17,500
 First round loser: £12,500
 Total: £440,000

Qualification 
Qualification for the event was made through winning events from the previous year. Events shown below in grey are for players who had already qualified for the event. The 2021 World Snooker Championship runner-up Shaun Murphy was awarded a position in the event as well as remaining players being made up by the highest ranked players in the world rankings. Mark Allen, who had qualified as defending champion, withdrew prior to the event during the 2021 English Open.

{|class="wikitable" span = 50 style="font-size:85%;
|-
|style="background:lightgrey": #cfc;" width=10|
|Player also qualified by winning another tournament
|}

Tournament draw

Final

Century breaks
A total of 12  were made during the tournament.

 140  Yan Bingtao
 132, 131  Mark Selby
 127  John Higgins
 114, 113, 112  Kyren Wilson
 107, 100  Neil Robertson
 104  Judd Trump
 104  Mark Williams
 101  Ronnie O'Sullivan

References

External links 
 

2021
2021 in snooker
2021 in English sport
Champion of Champions
Sport in Bolton